Vivo X70 is a line of Android-based smartphones developed and manufactured by Vivo, it featured the Zeiss co-engineered imaging system.

Notes

References 

Android (operating system) devices
Vivo smartphones
Mobile phones introduced in 2021